Tamnyaskey is a townland lying within the civil parish of Kilcronaghan, County Londonderry, Northern Ireland. It lies in the west of the parish, and is bounded by the townlands of Brackaghlislea, Calmore, Granny, Mormeal, and Tullyroan. It wasn't apportioned to any of the London livery companies, being kept as church lands.

The townland was part of the Tobermore electoral ward of the former Magherafelt District Council, however in 1926 it was part of Tobermore district electoral division as part of the Maghera division of Magherafelt Rural District. It was also part of the historic barony of Loughinsholin.

History
Along with the townlands of Granny, Mormeal, and Tullyroan, Tamneyaskey comprises the four townlands that make up the Bishop of Derrys lands in the parish. Prior to the Plantation of Ulster, these four townlands constituted the termon (or erenagh) land of the parish, and were known as "Ballintrolla, Derreskerdan, Dirrygrinagh et Kellynahawla". Despite these townlands being in the same location as the later townlands, it is now impossible to match their names accurately.

Statistics

See also
Kilcronaghan
List of townlands in Tobermore
Tobermore

References

Townlands of County Londonderry
Civil parish of Kilcronaghan